Tamale pie is a pie and casserole dish in the cuisine of the Southwestern United States. It is prepared with a cornmeal crust and ingredients typically used in tamales. It has been described as a comfort food. The dish, invented sometime in the early 1900s in the United States, may have originated in Texas, and its first known published recipe dates to 1911.

Overview
Tamale pie is prepared with a cornmeal crust and typical tamale fillings arranged in several layers. Beef is traditionally used, but it can also be prepared using other meats such as chicken and turkey meat, and can also be prepared as a meatless dish. Although sometimes characterized as Mexican food, these forms are not popular in Mexican-American culture, in which the individually wrapped style is preferred. Tamale pie has been described as a "comfort-food classic" in the book The Ultimate Casseroles Book, published by Better Homes and Gardens.

Ingredients and preparation
Ingredients that are used include beef and ground beef, pork, chorizo, chicken, beans, cheese, cornmeal, corn, creamed corn, beans, black olives, onion, garlic, tomato, bell peppers, chili peppers, salsa, butter, seasonings such as chili powder, salt and pepper. Standard fine cornmeal can be used, as can masa harina, a corn-based tortilla flour. Cheese may be used to top the dish, or inside the pie. The dish is typically baked in an oven. Garnishes used include cheese, sliced tomatoes, avocado slices, cilantro and olive oil.

History
Tamale pie was invented sometime in the early 1900s in the United States, and around the mid-1910s the dish was included in the curricula of some home economics classes in U.S. high schools. The dish may have originated in the U.S. state of Texas. John F. Mariani's 1983 title The Encyclopedia of American Food and Drink claims the first published recipe for tamale pie dates to 1911. Recipes for this style of dish were also published before then. The 1899 book The Capitol Cook Book, published in Austin, Texas, included a recipe for a similar pot pie prepared with a wheat flour crust on the top of the dish, and the 1905 book The Times Cook Book #2, published by the Los Angeles Times, included a recipe for a casserole with "cornmeal crusts above and below". Another cookbook published around the time of World War I has a tamale pie recipe, stating that the dish can be utilized to save wheat.

See also

 List of casserole dishes
 List of pies

References

External links
 

Casserole dishes
Cuisine of the Southwestern United States
Savoury pies